The Girl Next Door is a novel by British crime author Ruth Rendell which is published in 2014. It was the last of her novels published in her lifetime.

Plot and characters
During World War II, a group of children in Loughton, Essex, United Kingdom, which is where Rendell herself grew up, play in tunnels (in reality, the foundations of an uncompleted house) they discovered under a hill. In the present day they are reunited after the discovery of two hands in a tin box when the tunnels are dug up for construction work. The novel deals frankly with changes and interrelationships of the characters and social changes generally, over seven decades.

Critical reception
In a review in The Observer, it was noted that instead of focusing on the crime, the novel dealt with the lives of the now elderly people in the present.

In Marilyn Stasio's review for The New York Times, the novel's effective use of a split time frame was noted.

References

2014 British novels
Novels by Ruth Rendell
Novels set in Essex
Novels set during World War II
Loughton
Hutchinson (publisher) books